The 2006 NCAA Division I Football Championship Game was a postseason college football game between the UMass Minutemen and the Appalachian State Mountaineers. The game was played on December 15, 2006, at Finley Stadium, home field of the University of Tennessee at Chattanooga. This was the first season that the NCAA football classification formerly known as Division I-AA operated as the Football Championship Subdivision (FCS). The culminating game of the 2006 NCAA Division I FCS football season, it was won by Appalachian State, 28–17.

With sponsorship by Enterprise Rent-A-Car, the game was officially known as the NCAA Division I Championship presented by Enterprise Rent-A-Car.

Teams
The participants of the Championship Game were the finalists of the 2006 FCS Playoffs, which began with a 16-team bracket.

Appalachian State Mountaineers

Appalachian State finished their regular season with a 10–1 record (7–0 in conference). Their only loss was to NC State of the FBS, in their first game of the season. The Mountaineers were the first-seed in the tournament and defeated Coastal Carolina, Montana State, and fourth-seed Youngstown State to reach the final. This was Appalachian State's second consecutive appearance in the championship game, having won the title in 2005.

UMass Minutemen 

UMass finished their regular season with a 10–1 record (8–0 in conference). Their only loss was to Navy of the FBS, in their second game of the season. The Minutemen were the third-seed in the tournament and defeated Lafayette, New Hampshire, and second-seed Montana to reach the final. This was the third appearance for UMass in a Division I-AA/FCS championship game, having won in 1998 and having lost in 1978.

Game summary

Scoring summary

Game statistics

References

Further reading

External links
 Box score at umassathletics.com
 2006 FCS Championship - Appalachian State vs. UMass via YouTube

Championship Game
NCAA Division I Football Championship Games
Appalachian State Mountaineers football games
UMass Minutemen football games
College football in Tennessee
American football competitions in Chattanooga, Tennessee
NCAA Division I Football Championship Game
NCAA Division I Football Championship Game